Betahydroxythiofentanyl (β-hydroxythiofentanyl) is an opioid analgesic that is an analogue of fentanyl. Beginning as early as 2008, clandestine labs in China began to manufacture synthetic opioids on an industrial scale. Initially, these opioids were distributed in Eastern European markets such as Ukraine and Estonia. Beginning in 2015, fentanyl had replaced heroin as the opioid of choice due to its cheap cost of production and astronomical potency. Utilizing lax regulation in the ports of western Mexico, Mexican and Chinese criminal organizations began to traffic the drug en masse along the US/Mexico border. 

Betahydroxythiofentanyl was sold briefly on the black market from around 1985, before the introduction of the Federal Analog Act in 1986 which for the first time attempted to control entire families of drugs based on their structural similarity rather than scheduling each drug individually as they appeared. β-hydroxythiofentanyl was anecdotally said to be one of the more favored fentanyl analogues by opiate addicts, but nevertheless its brief career as a street drug did not survive the introduction of the Analogues Act.

Betahydroxythiofentanyl has similar effects to fentanyl. Side effects of fentanyl analogs are similar to those of fentanyl itself, which include itching, nausea and potentially serious respiratory depression, which can be life-threatening. Fentanyl analogs have killed hundreds of people throughout Europe and the former Soviet republics since the most recent resurgence in use began in Estonia in the early 2000s, and novel derivatives continue to appear.

Legal status

As of October 2015, betahydroxythiofentanyl is a controlled substance in China.

As of May 2016, betahydroxythiofentanyl is a Schedule I controlled substance in the United States.

See also
 Sufentanil
 Thiafentanil

References 

Synthetic opioids
Thiophenes
Piperidines
Secondary alcohols
Propionamides
Anilides
Mu-opioid receptor agonists